Kirby VanBurch is a professional magician who performed for most of his active career in Branson, Missouri.

Notable awards 
Van Burch was named "The Prince of Magic" by the Princess of Thailand and "Worlds Best Illusionist" at the 2008 World Magic Awards.  He began his magic career at age 7 in Houston, Texas after seeing a magic show. He later moved to Las Vegas, Nevada and became the youngest performer in the casino area of Fremont Street. He celebrated the opening of a twenty-story tower by being hoisted twenty stories in the air and attempting to escape a straight jacket and foot shackles suspended by a flaming rope over a cage filled with hungry lions.

Performing history 
Van Burch spent many years working in Branson, Missouri as a stage performer, during which time he collaborated with many other performers. For some time, Van Burch performed at his own theater in Branson with 12 animals, including white tigers, panthers,   His show also featured several large-scale illusions, including an appearing helicopter  Kirby performed in Branson for 20 years.  He performed at his most recent theater for 6 years, and has headlined at 9 different theaters in Branson, Missouri.

Current performing status 
Van Burch was in negotiations in early 2014 to begin performing at the Lodge of the Ozarks in Branson, but that arrangement is still pending.

References

Living people
American magicians
Year of birth missing (living people)